The Central District of Gotvand County is a district (bakhsh) in Gotvand County, Khuzestan Province, Iran. At the 2006 census, its population was 40,206, in 7,878 families.  The district has two cities: Gotvand and Jannat Makan. The district has two rural districts (dehestan): Jannat Makan Rural District and Kiyaras Rural District.

References 

Gotvand County
Districts of Khuzestan Province